Astra is a professional software to organize digital broadcasting service for TV operators and broadcasters, internet service providers, hotels, etc. Astra is an acronym for "advanced streaming application".

Astra supports many protocols and standards to receive channels from different sources. Received channels prepares and transmits into the IP network. Built-in scripting language (Lua) allow to customize business logic of the application.

Features

 Data format: MPEG-TS
 Receiving formats and standards:
 DVB-S, DVB-T, DVB-C, ATSC, ASI
 RTSP
 HTTP
 HLS
 UDP, RTP
 MPEG-TS files
 Transmitting formats and standards:
 HTTP
 HLS
 UDP, RTP
 MPEG-TS files
 DVB
 Data processing:
 Descrambling: DVB-CI
 MPEG-TS demultiplexing – extract single channel from the multi-program transport stream
 MPEG-TS multiplexing – combine several channels into single multi-program transport stream
 DVB-T2 MI decapsulation
 Analyzing MPEG-TS streams
 Redundancy for incoming streams
 MPEG-TS PID remapping and filtering
 Other:
 Scripting language: Lua
 Web-Interface
 REST API for management
 HbbTV
 Telemetry and monitoring
 Access authorization
 EPG export (XMLTV or JSON)

References

External links
 Official website
 Source code repository on Bitbucket

Digital Video Broadcasting software